Kings Avenue station is a Jacksonville Skyway station in Jacksonville, Florida. It is located on Onyx Street between Prudential Drive and Louisa Street in the Southbank area of Downtown Jacksonville.

History 
The Kings Avenue station was developed as part of the Jacksonville Skyway's Southbank segment, which carried the Skyway over the St. Johns River via the Acosta Bridge. This station and the adjacent Riverplace station opened on November 1, 2000, completing the Southbank segment as well as Phase I of the Skyway's development. It is connected to the Kings Avenue Garage, a park-and-ride garage, via walkway passing beneath Interstate 95. Some Jacksonville Transportation Authority bus lines run through the station.

The station is the Skyway's southern terminus; Riverplace station is next in the line. The station is near a number of hotels and residential towers.

References 

Jacksonville Skyway stations
Railway stations in the United States opened in 2000
2000 establishments in Florida